Matej Podlogar (born 23 February 1991) is a Slovenian footballer who plays for Domžale.

References

External links
NZS profile 

1991 births
Living people
Footballers from Ljubljana
Slovenian footballers
Slovenia under-21 international footballers
Association football forwards
Association football wingers
NK IB 1975 Ljubljana players
NK Rudar Velenje players
NK Domžale players
NK Celje players
PAS Lamia 1964 players
NK Triglav Kranj players
Olimpia Grudziądz players
Slovenian Second League players
Slovenian PrvaLiga players
I liga players
Slovenian expatriate footballers
Slovenian expatriate sportspeople in Greece
Expatriate footballers in Greece
Slovenian expatriate sportspeople in Poland
Expatriate footballers in Poland